Wheelchair fencing at the 2008 Summer Paralympics was held in the Fencing Gymnasium of the Olympic Green Convention Centre from 14 September to 17 September.

Classification
Fencers were given a classification depending on the type and extent of their disability. The classification system allows fencers to compete against others with a similar level of function. Fencing has two classes, A and B. Wheelchairs were anchored to the ground during competition.

Events
The five event types below were competed for both class A and class B, for a total of ten events.

Men's épée
Men's foil
Men's sabre
Women's épée
Women's foil

Participating countries
There were 84 fencers (60 male, 24 female) from 19 nations taking part in this sport.

Medal summary

Medal table

This ranking sorts countries by the number of gold medals earned by their fencers (in this context a country is an entity represented by a National Paralympic Committee). The number of silver medals is taken into consideration next and then the number of bronze medals. If, after the above, countries are still tied, equal ranking is given and they are listed alphabetically.

Men's events

Women's events

References

External links
Official site of the 2008 Summer Paralympics

 
2008
Paralympics
2008 Summer Paralympics events
International fencing competitions hosted by China